Maya the Bee is the main character in The Adventures of Maya the Bee, a German book written by Waldemar Bonsels and published in 1912. The book has been published in many other languages and adapted into different media. The first American edition was published in 1922 by Thomas Seltzer and illustrated by Homer Boss. The latter's wife Adele Szold-Seltzer (1876-1940), the daughter of Benjamin Szold and younger sister of Henrietta Szold, was the translator.   

The stories revolve around a little bee named Maya and her friends Willy the bee, Flip the grasshopper (referred to as "Maja", "Willi" and "Philip" respectively in some versions), Miss Cassandra (Maya's teacher), and many other insects and other creatures. The book depicts Maya's development from an adventurous youngster to a responsible adult member of bee society.

Plot
Bonsels' original book contains fewer than 200 pages. The storyline is centered on the relation of Maya and her many adventures.

Maya is a bee born in a bee hive during internal unrest: the hive is dividing itself into two new colonies. Maya is raised by her teacher, Miss Cassandra. Despite Miss Cassandra's warnings, Maya wants to explore the wide world and commits the unforgivable crime of leaving the hive. During her adventures, Maya, now in exile, befriends other insects and braves dangers with them. In the climax of the book, Maya is taken prisoner by hornets, the bees' sworn enemies.

Prisoner of the hornets, Maya learns of a hornet plan to attack her native hive. Maya is faced with the decision to either return to hive and suffer her due punishment, saving the hive, or leaving the plan unannounced, saving herself but destroying the hive. After severe pondering, she makes the decision to return. In the hive, she announces the coming attack and is unexpectedly pardoned. The forewarned bees triumph over the hornet attack force. Maya, now a heroine of the hive, becomes a teacher like Miss Cassandra and shares her experiences and wisdom with the future generation.

Analysis of the book 

It has been suggested by Sulevi Riukulehto that the book may have carried a political message, analogous to Jean de La Fontaine's or Ivan Krylov's work. According to this view, Maya represents the ideal citizen, and the beehive represents a well-organised militarist society. It has also elements of nationalism and speciesism. Maya gets angry in two instances. First, a grasshopper fails to distinguish between bees and wasps. Maya's verbal response includes calling the wasps "a useless gang of bandits" [Räubergeschlecht] that have no "home or faith" [Heimat und Glauben]. Second, a fly calls Maya an idiot, which prompts Maya to shout that she's going to teach "respect for bees" and to threaten the fly with her stinger. The critic  Riukulehto interprets this to mean that respect is based on the threat of violence. Collectivism versus individualism is also a theme. Maya's independence and departure from the beehive is seen as reproachable, but it is atoned by her warning of the hornets' attack. This show of loyalty restores her position in the society. In the hornet attack part of the story, the bees' will to defend the hive and the heroic deaths of bee officers are glorified, often in overtly militarist tones.

In the post-WWII adaptations, the militarist element was toned down considerably, the hornets' role reduced, and the character of Willy, a lazy and quite un-warlike drone bee, was introduced (he does not appear in the novel). In the cartoon series, the briskly marching, but ridiculously incompetent ant armies provide a parody of militarism.

Main characters
 Maya – Bee. The series main protagonist. She loves freedom and living in the meadow by herself, unlike other bees who live in the hive. She is good, fair, happy and willing to help everybody.
 Willy – Bee. Lazy, clumsy, and cowardly, sometimes a showoff, but generally good-natured – not featured in the original Bonsels story, but a major character in all adaptations other than the 1926 film. His relationship to Maya is depicted inconsistently: in most adaptations, he's her best friend, who is secretly in love with her, prone to jealousy when Maya's attentions turn to others. Often reluctantly dragged into adventures by Maya.
 Flip (or Philip) – Grasshopper. A wise friend of Maya and Willy. Introduced first in the animated series. Whether he is meant to be identical with the unnamed grasshopper of the books is unclear.
 Alexander (or Aleksander) – Mouse. Intellectual, whose level of respect among the other creatures, and close friendship with Maya, often sends Willy into jealous rages. Appears only in the second season of the older animated series (1978).
 Miss Cassandra – Bee, Teacher at the Bee-School.

Films, anime and television

1926 film
German director Wolfram Junghans made a 1926 silent version ("starring" real insects). The film was lost for a decade until the only original copy of the film was found in Finland. The material was restored in 2005 with a new musical score and released on DVD in 2012, in collaboration with the KAVI and the Bundesarchiv-Filmarchiv, and the film was screened in both Hamburg and Helsinki.

1975 anime
Perhaps the most popular and widely known adaptation of the story is the Japanese anime . Originally aired on Japanese TV in 1975, the anime has been dubbed into 42 languages and screened on television in various territories. The Japanese TV series was preceded by Tokyo Kodomo Club's musical play based on the short story, presented as Mitsubachi Māya ("Maya the Honeybee"), distributed on an LP album.

The original theme was composed by Karel Svoboda and sung by Karel Gott in the German, Czech and Slovak versions; Zbigniew Wodecki in the Polish version.

2012 TV series
In 2012 Studio 100 Animation produced a 78-episode, 13-minute TV series. The series was rendered in CGI animation. A second 52 episode season aired in 2017.

Film series
A 2014 film adaptation based upon the 2012 series was released. In 2018, a sequel to the 2014 film, titled Maya the Bee: The Honey Games, released on March 1, 2018 in Germany and May 1, 2018 in United States. 

In 2021, third film, titled Maya the Bee: The Golden Orb was released on January 7, 2021 in Australia. It was delayed from its original 2020 release date due to the COVID-19 pandemic.

Stage performances

Opera
Maya the Bee also served as the basis for a children's opera written by the Croatian composer Bruno Bjelinski in 1963. In 2008 it was staged in Villach, Austria as part of their Carinthian Summer Music Festival. This performance was distinguished by having the "bees" played by children and not professional opera singers as it is usually the case.

Puppet musical
Singer-songwriter Nancy Harrow created a jazz-musical version of the story, called The Adventures of Maya the Bee, that featured puppets by Zofia Czechlewska. Harrow's adaptation was produced in New York City by The Culture Project in 2000, and was revived in 2012.

Musical
On October 10, 2016, Belgian company Studio 100 (the current owners of the series) created a Flemish stage musical called "Maya en de Pollenbollen" based on the 2012 series that has the people dressed in costumes for the characters from the show. The show contains songs made by Studio 100 with a few news songs created exclusively for the show. The musical centers around Maya alongside Flip and Beatrice celebrating Willy's birthday. The musical later returned in the Spring of 2017.

Since 2016, live actors from the original stage show make numerous appearances at numerous stage shows and special events held by Studio 100. Notably Studio 100's annual "De Grote Sinterklaasshow" held from late November till early December featuring Sinterklaas and Zwarte Pieten  watching various Studio 100 Characters such as Kabouter Plop, and Piet Piraat (including Maya and friends) perform musical numbers on stage. The same actress that portrayed Maya in the musical is also the official Flemish voice of the character and reprised her role for Studio 100's "De Liedjestuin" where Maya is singing various Dutch children's songs and nursery rhymes. In The French and Walloon version "Le Jardin des Refrains", Maya is played by a different actress.

Amusement Parks
After Studio 100's acquisition of the franchise, Plopsa began expanding the franchise to its own theme parks. Plopsaland De Panne opened an indoor children's area called "Mayaland" on July 3rd, 2011 before the CGI incarnation's begun airing on numerous television stations across Europe. Maya alongside Flip, and Willy would also appear at other Plopsa owned parks such as Plopsa Coo and Plopsa Indoor Hasselt. In Poland, Plopsa opened an indoor theme park called "Majaland Kownaty" which opened to the public on September 28th, 2018 which is mostly themed to Maya the Bee but features other Studio 100's IPs (such as Bumba and Piet Piraat).

A year after Mayaland opened in Plopsaland, Holiday Park, Germany opened a similar Maya the Bee children's area called "Majaland" which opened March 31, 2012.

Video games
 Maya the Bee & Her Friends (Game Boy Color – 1999)
Developed by Crawfish, published by Acclaim. Originally developed as a South Park themed game before being reskinned.
 Maya the Bee – Garden Adventures (Game Boy Color – 2000)
Developed by Neon Studios, published by Acclaim.
 Maya the Bee and Friends (mobile – 2006)
Developed by Kiloo and co-published by Plan-B Media.
 Maya the Bee: The Great Adventure (Game Boy Advance – 2002)
Developed by Shin'en Multimedia, published by Acclaim.
 Maya the Bee: Sweet Gold (Game Boy Advance – 2005)
Developed by Shin'en Multimedia, published by Midway.
 The Bee Game (Game Boy Advance, Nintendo DS – 2007)
The Bee Game is an adventure video game released for Nintendo DS and Game Boy Advance, developed by German studio Independent Arts Software. The game lets players experience the adventures of Maya the Bee and her friend Willie as they search for their friends, lost from a strong storm that has blown through Corn Poppy Meadow.
 Maya (Nintendo DS – 2013)
Developed by Studio 100 and Engine Software, published by Bandai Namco Games Europe.
 Maya the Bee: The Nutty Race (iOS and Android – 2019)
Mobile racing game. Developed by Midnight Pigeon in cooperation with Studio 100.

Merchandising
Many companies contributed worldwide to the success of the character by producing and selling merchandising. Most of them were drawn between 1976 and 1986 by the French licensed characters specialist André Roche. His works have included motifs for textiles, porcelain, books, comics and games, including a campaign for Kinder Surprise Eggs.

See also 
 Maya the Honey Bee

References

External links
  
 
The Finnish Film Archive (November 23, 2005). "Esitykset: Maija Mehiläinen" (in Finnish). Retrieved January 20, 2006.
cinefest – International Festival of German Film Heritage. Retrieved January 20, 2006.
Silent film version on DVD with english subtitles. Retrieved March 18, 2020.

1912 children's books
German children's literature
German comic strips
German comics titles
German comics characters
German novels adapted into television shows
Picture books
 
Animal tales
Anthropomorphic arthropods
Fictional bees
Female characters in comics
Female characters in literature
Comics about women
Children's books about friendship